Johann von Eindhoven, C.R.S.A. (1439–7 October 1509) was a Roman Catholic prelate who served as Auxiliary Bishop of Trier (1483–1508).

Biography
Johann von Eindhoven was born in 1439 and ordained a priest in the Canons Regular of Saint Augustine. On 27 February 1483, he was appointed during the papacy of Pope Sixtus IV as Auxiliary Bishop of Trier and Titular Bishop of Azotus. On 1 June 1483, he was consecrated bishop by Stefan Teglatije, Archbishop of Bar, with Genesius, Titular Archbishop of Mitylene serving as co-consecrator. He served as Auxiliary Bishop of Trier until his resignation on 3 January 1508. He died on 7 October 1509.

References 

15th-century Roman Catholic bishops in the Holy Roman Empire
Bishops appointed by Pope Sixtus IV
1439 births
1509 deaths